Débora García Mateo (born 17 October 1989), commonly known as Débora, is a Spanish footballer who plays as a midfielder for Primera División club Sevilla. In October 2012 she made her debut for the Spain national team at Glasgow's Hampden Park against Scotland in the 2013 European Championship's qualifying play-offs.

Club career

Débora progressed from RCD Espanyol's youth teams and won two Copa de la Reinas and one league title with the Catalan club. In 2014, she transferred to Atlético Madrid. She won the 2016 Copa de la Reina with Atlético, then signed for Valencia the following month. She returned to Espanyol in 2019.

References

External links

 
 
 Profile at aupaAthletic.com 
 Profile at La Liga 

1989 births
Living people
Spanish women's footballers
Spain women's international footballers
Primera División (women) players
Atlético Madrid Femenino players
RCD Espanyol Femenino players
UE L'Estartit players
Valencia CF Femenino players
Women's association football wingers
Footballers from Barcelona
Sportswomen from Catalonia
21st-century Spanish women